Harold Ray "Doc" Daugherty (October 12, 1927 – August 15, 2015) was an American professional baseball player and manager, and high school football head coach. A shortstop in minor league baseball, he made one appearance as a pinch hitter in the Major Leagues for the Detroit Tigers in 1951. 

A native of Weirton, West Virginia, Daugherty attended Ohio State University, where he played football. After his baseball playing career ended, he became a teacher and coach in West Virginia and Ohio, and also managed the Short Season-Class A Duluth–Superior Dukes for the 1965 season.

References

External links

Wickline, John, 'Doc Daugherty', SABR Biography Project
Obituary

1927 births
2015 deaths
Baseball players from Pennsylvania
Baseball players from West Virginia
Buffalo Bisons (minor league) players
Charleston Senators players
Detroit Tigers players
Little Rock Travelers players
Minor league baseball managers
People from Weirton, West Virginia
Springfield Cubs players
Toledo Mud Hens players
Williamsport Tigers players
People from Washington County, Pennsylvania
Cocoa Rookie League Tigers players